The 142nd Rifle Division began service in August 1939 as a standard Red Army rifle division, which participated in the Winter War against Finland. It remained on the Karelian Isthmus and had a relatively uneventful war facing the Finns until the Vyborg–Petrozavodsk Offensive began on June 10, 1944, from which point it saw much more active service. Following the end of the Continuation War, the division was transferred to 2nd Shock Army in 2nd Belorussian Front. Its soldiers distinguished themselves in the capture of the German city of Graudenz and ended the war fighting through Pomerania.

Formation 
The division began forming in August 1939, north of Leningrad, where it would spend most of the war. On November 30 the Winter War with Finland began, and the division performed creditably enough that it was awarded the Order of the Red Banner.

On June 22, 1941, the division was in 19th Rifle Corps of 23rd Army near the Finnish border in Leningrad Military District. Its order of battle was as follows:
 461st Rifle Regiment
 588th Rifle Regiment
 701st Rifle Regiment
 334th Light Artillery Regiment
 234th Antitank Battalion
 227th Sapper Battalion
 196th Signal Battalion
 172nd Reconnaissance Company
P.S. Pshennikov, who had commanded the division in the Winter War, had been promoted to the rank of lieutenant general and was now in command of 23rd Army. On July 31 the Finnish Army began its offensive against 23rd Army and over the following month pushed south down the Karelian Isthmus as the Russian forces conducted a fighting retreat. On August 31 the front had reached general line of the 1939 Finnish-Soviet border, and the Finns halted. The 142nd would remain along this line, fighting a static war, until June 1944.

Karelian Offensive 
The German forces to the south of Leningrad were driven away in January 1944. In early June, the Soviet 23rd and 21st Armies were reinforced for a reckoning with Finland. The 142nd, now in 115th Rifle Corps and under command of Col. G.L. Sonnikov, was on the extreme right flank and in first echelon of 23rd Army on the shores of Lake Ladoga. The offensive began on June 10. After initial attacks, the division advanced 9km on June 14 against the Finnish 19th Infantry Brigade, piercing the first Finnish defensive belt.

The offensive slowed as Finnish resistance grew, and it wasn't until early July that the army forced its way to the Vuoksi River and cleared the south bank. An assault crossing was made by the 461st Rifle Regiment on July 9 which gained a foothold on the north bank, allowing the rest of the division to cross, and a bridgehead 7km wide and 2km deep was established. The Finnish III Army responded with reinforcements, trying to crush the bridgehead. In the end they were only able to contain it. After three days of fighting, 23rd Army went over to the defense. The Moscow Armistice brought the fighting to a halt, leaving the 142nd available for the assault on Germany.

Advance Into Germany 
After spending October rebuilding in Stavka reserves, the 142nd was transferred to the 98th Rifle Corps, where it would remain for the duration. That corps was, in turn, transferred to 2nd Shock Army, which was placed under command of Marshal K.K. Rokossovsky in 2nd Belorussian Front. The division would remain under these commands for the duration as well.

The 142nd took part in the Vistula-Oder Offensive, advancing on the right flank of its Front. During this overall offensive it also participated in the East Pomeranian Offensive, and distinguished itself in the capture of the city of Graudenz on Mar. 6, 1945. Seven officers and men were named as Heroes of the Soviet Union for this victory, and the division received the city's name as an honorific. The division finished the war along the Baltic coast in west Pomerania, with the official designation: 142nd Rifle, Graudenz, Order of the Red Banner Division. (Russian: 142-я стрелковая Граудзендзкая Краснознамённая дивизия.)

Feskov et al 2013 notes the division disbanded in the Northern Group of Forces in Poland in summer 1945, in accordance with Stavka VGK Order No. 11097 dated 29 April 1945.

References
* 

142
Military units and formations established in 1939
Military units and formations disestablished in 1945
Military units and formations of the Soviet Union in the Winter War
Continuation War
Military units and formations awarded the Order of the Red Banner